Benjamin William Smith (born 16 October 1984) is an Australian former professional rugby league footballer who played as a  and  for the Parramatta Eels in the NRL.

Early life
Smith was born in Quirindi, New South Wales, playing for his junior club, the Werris Creek Magpies.

Rugby league career
Smith made his first grade debut in round 20 of the 2004 NRL season for Parramatta against Melbourne Storm in a 22-16 loss at Olympic Park in Melbourne.

He established himself in the NRL in 2005, when he had a boom rookie season alongside club namesake, Tim Smith. The monster centre of 102 kg, easily big enough to play in the forwards, damaged opposition teams out wide with his size and strength, he played 18 games and scored 14 tries in an outstanding rookie year.  Smith was a part of the 2005 Minor Premiership winning side which made it to the preliminary final before suffering a shock loss going down to North Queensland 29-0.

The 2006 NRL season loomed as a learning curve season for Smith as after initially showing all the promise he had from the previous season, he sustained a serious leg injury against the North Queensland Cowboys in round 4, and was sidelined for half the NRL season. He only managed 14 games for three tries, however, it provided the platform for him to return to his best in 2007.

Plagued by injuries, Smith's young career has been shortened by extended periods when he was not fit to play.  Throughout the 2007 and 2008 seasons, he was in and out of the Parramatta backline. In the 2009 NRL season, Smith began playing in the forward pack.  The decision by Eels coach Daniel Anderson was not surprising, given Smith's 16 stone physique.  Smith played for Parramatta in the 2009 NRL Grand Final 23-16 defeat against Melbourne.  Melbourne were later stripped of the premiership for major and deliberate breaches of the salary cap.

In the 2010 NRL season, Smith played 19 games as Parramatta failed to build upon their grand final appearance in 2009, missing the finals series by finishing 12th.  The following year in 2011, Smith played nearly every game for the club as they narrowly avoided the wooden spoon.  Parramatta defeated the Gold Coast in the final game of the year to avoid finishing last.  

On 13 May 2012, Smith re-signed with the Eels until the end of the 2014 NRL season.  Parramatta would finish last on the table in 2012 for the first time since 1972. In June 2013, Smith was one of 12 Parramatta players that were told that their futures at the club were uncertain by coach, Ricky Stuart.  Parramatta would finish the 2013 NRL season with the Wooden Spoon for a second consecutive year.

Smith retired at the end of the 2014 NRL season, finishing his career a one club player with 152 games for the Parramatta Eels.

References

External links
 Parramatta Eels biography page

1984 births
Australian rugby league players
Parramatta Eels players
Prime Minister's XIII players
Wentworthville Magpies players
Rugby league locks
Rugby league second-rows
Rugby league centres
Living people
Rugby league players from New South Wales